Vipsanius Clemens (died 16 AD) was an impostor in Ancient Rome who attempted to impersonate the Roman emperor Augustus' grandson Postumus Agrippa (Marcus Vipsanius Agrippa Postumus). He afterwards also became known as pseudo-Agrippa.

Biography
He was a former slave of Agrippa Postumus, the grandson of Augustus, who was killed around the time Tiberius came to power. Clemens appeared claiming that he really was Postumus, and gained a significant band of followers, but was captured and executed by Tiberius. It is reputed that when he was brought before Tiberius, he was asked: "How did you become Agrippa?" Clemens replied "The same way you became Caesar".

Meyer Reinhold noted a magistrate at Verona in Venetia and Histria in 1 BC named Sextus Vipsanius Clemens who was the son of a Marcus Vipsanius, possibly associated with Clemens the impostor. August Pauly proposed that the man could be the impostor's son. Anthony A. Barrett believes the two should not be assumed to be the same man. Ralf Scharf states in his work Agrippa Postumus: Splitter einer historischen Figur that "Clemens" is simply too common a name for there to be any certain connection.

In fiction
Robert Graves, in his novel I, Claudius, makes the suggestion that this person really was Postumus. This was not included in the 1976 TV adaptation, which does not include Clemens and instead explicitly shows Postumus being killed while in exile.

See also
 Pseudo-Nero
 Pseudo-Marius
 Pseudo-Alexios II
 Pseudo-Plutarch
 Pseudo-Apuleius

Notes

References

Impostor pretenders
16 deaths
1st-century BC births
Year of birth unknown
1st-century BC Romans
1st-century Romans
Imperial Roman slaves and freedmen
Executed ancient Roman people
Vipsanii
People executed by the Roman Empire